Chao Lu (born 6 March 1970) is a Chinese boxer. He competed in the men's middleweight event at the 1992 Summer Olympics.

References

External links
 

1970 births
Living people
Chinese male boxers
Olympic boxers of China
Boxers at the 1992 Summer Olympics
Place of birth missing (living people)
Middleweight boxers
20th-century Chinese people